Acalyptris lotella is a moth of the family Nepticulidae. It is found in California, United States.

The larvae mine the stems of Lotus scoparius species.

External links

A new Microcalyptris species from California (Lepidoptera: Nepticulidae)

Nepticulidae
Endemic fauna of California
Moths of North America
Fauna of the California chaparral and woodlands
Moths described in 1987
Fauna without expected TNC conservation status